Janine Micheau (17 April 1914 – 18 October 1976) was a French operatic soprano, one of the leading sopranos of her era in France, particularly associated with lyric soprano and coloratura soprano repertory.

Biography
Janine (or Jeanine) Micheau was born in Toulouse, and studied voice at the Conservatoire de Paris. She made her professional debut at the Opéra-Comique on 16 November 1933, as la Plieuse in Louise, following this with Loys in Juif polonais by Camille Erlanger, the neighbour in Angélique by Jacques Ibert and small roles in Lakmé (Miss Rose) and Mireille (Andreloun).

She later sang Cherubino in Le nozze di Figaro, Olympia in Les contes d'Hoffmann, Rosina in Il barbiere di Siviglia, Leila in Les pêcheurs de perles, Micaela in Carmen, and the title role in Lakmé at the Salle Favart. By 1935 her performances gained her invitations to Marseille (Lakmé), and then (at the instigation of Pierre Monteux) to Amsterdam (Mélisande) and San Francisco. In Buenos Aires Erich Kleiber conducted her in Sophie in Der Rosenkavalier.

She created the role of Creuse in Darius Milhaud's Médée, for her debut at the Paris Opéra in 1940, where she also sang Gilda in Rigoletto, Violetta in La traviata and Sophie in Der Rosenkavalier, among other roles.

Once the war was over, her career became more international than it had been; she performed at La Scala in Milan, La Monnaie in Brussels, and the Royal Opera House in London. At these venues she sang nearly all the great French soprano roles: including Marguerite, Juliette in the Gounod opera, Massenet's Manon, and Mélisande in Pelléas. For French Radio she sang in Isoline (1947) and Madame Chrysanthème (1956), by André Messager.

Micheau was also active in concert  especially in 18th century French works such as Rameau's Les Indes galantes and Platée. She made many recordings, of which some have been released on CDs. Concert works in her repertoire included Shéhérazade by Ravel, Le martyre de Saint Sébastien and La Damoiselle élue by Debussy, songs by Milhaud and Debussy, and À la musique by Chabrier (which she also recorded).

From 1961 she became a voice teacher at the Paris Conservatoire, and the Mozarteum in Salzburg. Her final performance was as Pamina in Rouen in May 1968. She died in Paris at the age of 62.

Selected recordings

 1951 – Bizet – Carmen – Suzanne Juyol, Libero de Luca, Janine Micheau, Julien Giovannetti – Choeur et orchestre de l'Opéra-Comique, Albert Wolff – Decca
 1951 – Massenet – Manon – Janine Micheau, Libero de Luca, Roger Bourdin, Julien Giovanetti – Choeur et Orchestre de l'Opéra-Comique, Albert Wolff – Decca
 1953 – Thomas – Mignon – Geneviève Moizan, Janine Micheau, Libero de Luca, René Bianco – Choeur et Orchestre Nationale de Belgique, Georges Sébastian – Decca
 1953 – Gounod – Roméo et Juliette – Raoul Jobin, Janine Micheau, Heinz Rehfuss – Paris Opera Chorus and Orchestra, Alberto Erede – Decca
 1953 – Debussy – Pelléas et Mélisande – Camille Maurane, Janine Micheau, Michel Roux, Xavier Depraz, Rita Gorr – , Orchestre Lamoureux, Jean Fournet – Philips
 1955 – Stravinsky – Le Rossignol – Janine Micheau, Lucien Lovano, Jean Giraudeau, Michel Roux, Bernard Cottret – Choeur et Orchestre de la Radiodiffusion Francaise, André Cluytens – EMI
 1955 – Gluck – Orphée et Eurydice – Nicolai Gedda, Janine Micheau, Liliane Berton – Choeur et Orchestre du Conservatoire de Paris, Louis de Froment – EMI
 1956 – Rameau – Platée – Michel Sénéchal, Janine Micheau, Nicolai Gedda, Jacques Jansen – Choeurs du Festival d'Aix en Provence, Orchestre de la Société des Concerts du Conservatoire, Hans Rosbaud – EMI
 1957 – Lalo – Le roi d'Ys – Pierre Savignol, Rita Gorr, Janine Micheau, Henri Legay, Jean Borthayre – Choeur et Orchestre de la Radiodiffusion Francaise, André Cluytens – EMI
 1959 – Bizet – Carmen – Victoria de los Angeles, Nicolai Gedda, Janine Micheau, Ernest Blanc – Choeur et Orchestre de la RTF, Thomas Beecham – EMI
 1960 – Bizet – Les pêcheurs de perles – Janine Micheau, Nicolai Gedda, Ernest Blanc, Jacques Mars – Choeur et Orchestre de l'Opéra-Comique, Pierre Dervaux – EMI

On the lighter side, in 1958 Micheau recorded an LP with Paul Bonneau conducting the Chœurs Raymond Saint-Paul and orchestra, including "Fascination", "Oh! La troublante volupté" from La Reine s'amuse (1912) by Charles Cuvillier, Les chemins de l'amour, Les cent vierges (Charles Lecocq), "Moulin rouge", Valse des souvenirs by Wal-Berg, and Messager's "Si j'avais vos ailes", among others.

Sources 

 Dictionnaire des interprètes, Alain Pâris, (Robert Laffont, 1982), 
 Guide de l’opéra, Mancini & Rouveroux, (Fayard, 1995). 

1914 births
1976 deaths
French operatic sopranos
Musicians from Toulouse
Conservatoire de Paris alumni
Academic staff of the Conservatoire de Paris
Academic staff of Mozarteum University Salzburg
20th-century French women opera singers
Women music educators
Decca Records artists